Charles Rowcroft (1798, London – 1856), pastoralist and novelist, the son of Thomas Edward Rowcroft, a British consul in Peru.

Rowcroft was educated at Eton, after which he went to Hobart Town, Australia, in 1821 and took up a grant of 2,000 acres (8 km2), near Bothwell, where he was one of the first European settlers along with his brother Horace. In 1822 he was mad a justice of the peace, he was also a member of the committee of the Agricultural Society of Van Diemen's Land and an original shareholder of the Van Diemen's Land Bank. He unsuccessfully applied for the position of colonial secretary in 1823. In 1824 he was sued, successfully, for a criminal conversation, by Edward Lord, with damages of £100 awarded against Rowcroft. He returned to England in 1826.

In 1827 Rowcroft bought a boarding school in Streatham, London.

In 1843 he published Tales of the Colonies, the fist Australian novel of the immigrant genre, followed by The Bushranger of Van Diemen's Land (1846). Another of his novels, An Emigrant in Search of a Colony (1851), is also connected with Australia.

Rowcroft was appointed the first British consul to Cincinnatii in 1852. He sailed from New York to return to England on 17 August 1856 but died at sea on 23 August. He was survived by his wife and two daughters and three sons.

References

 The Oxford Companion to Australian Literature, second edition, 1994, Oxford University Press.
 Australian Dictionary of Biography

External links
 
 

1798 births
1856 deaths
People educated at Eton College
British diplomats
English emigrants to colonial Australia
English male novelists
19th-century English novelists
19th-century English male writers
19th-century Australian novelists
19th-century male writers